Manuel Miquel Rodríguez (1812, Linares – 1879) was a Chilean politician.

References 

1812 births
1879 deaths
People from Linares
Chilean people of Catalan descent
Conservative Party (Chile) politicians
Members of the Chamber of Deputies of Chile